Malcolm Turvey is a British Professor of Film Studies at  Tufts University and an editor of the journal October. He formerly taught at Sarah Lawrence College.

Books
The Filming of Modern Life: European Avant-Garde Film of the 1920s, MIT Press (March 2011) 
Camera Obscura, Camera Lucida: Essays in Honor of Annette Michelson, Amsterdam University Press (November 1, 2002) 
Doubting Vision: Film and the Revelationist Tradition, Oxford University Press (July 31, 2008)

References

 Article from Pop Matters about The Filming of Modern Life

Living people
Year of birth missing (living people)
Tufts University faculty